The 2005 London Broncos season was the twenty-sixth in the club's history and their tenth season in the Super League. The club was coached by Tony Rea, competing in Super League X, finishing in 6th place and competing in the end of season play-offs. The club also got to the Quarter-finals round of the Challenge Cup.

2005 London Broncos squad
Sources: SLstats - 2005 Summary

Super League X table

Super League X play-offs

2005 Challenge Cup
The Broncos progressed beyond the fifth round stage of the cup for the first time in five years, before being knocked out in the quarter finals by the Leeds Rhinos.

References

External links
London Broncos - Rugby League Project

London Broncos seasons
London Broncos